The Washington County Jail is located on Cherry Street, beside the courthouse, in downtown Washington, Pennsylvania.

It was listed on the National Register of Historic Places on July 30, 1974.  It is designated as a historic public landmark by the Washington County History & Landmarks Foundation.

See also 
 National Register of Historic Places listings in Washington County, Pennsylvania

Gallery

References

External links
[ National Register nomination form]

Jails on the National Register of Historic Places in Pennsylvania
Government buildings completed in 1899
Buildings and structures in Washington County, Pennsylvania
Frederick J. Osterling buildings
Washington, Pennsylvania
1899 establishments in Pennsylvania
National Register of Historic Places in Washington County, Pennsylvania
Jails in Pennsylvania